A Coin in Nine Hands is a 1934 novel by the French writer Marguerite Yourcenar. A reworked edition was published in 1959.

See also
 1934 in literature
 20th-century French literature

References

1934 French novels
Novels by Marguerite Yourcenar
Éditions Grasset books